"Wouldn't It Be Good" is a song by English singer-songwriter Nik Kershaw, released on 20 January 1984 as the second single from his debut studio album, Human Racing (1984). The release was Kershaw's second single, with the non-album track "Monkey Business" as the B-side; it was a bonus track on the 2012 re-release of the album. The music video was directed by Storm Thorgerson.

Background and recording
"Wouldn't It Be Good" was the second single from Kershaw's debut studio album Human Racing (1984). It spent three weeks at number four on the UK Singles Chart and was successful throughout Europe, as well as a top-10 entry in Canada and Australia. Kershaw is also most closely associated with this song in the United States, where it narrowly missed the top 40. Kershaw performed this song at Live Aid in London's Wembley Stadium in July 1985.

Kershaw's first single from this album had failed to be a major hit, and it was on the strength of this recording's success that the earlier single, "I Won't Let the Sun Go Down on Me", was promoted for a re-release. This time the single went all the way to number two in the UK, becoming his highest-charting single there to date.

Kershaw remembers that this was one of the last songs he wrote for the Human Racing album, firstly mapping out the chords on a keyboard. However, the aggressive guitar sound he wanted led to a clash in harmonics and therefore the result sounded rather unpleasant. Thus he decided to create a kind of "guitar orchestra", inspired by work of Queen's Brian May, where the notes were separated into single lines and harmonies. Kershaw elaborates on the layering of the guitar lines:
 
According to Kershaw, there were about 20 guitars on this song alone, and there was a bit of trouble in trying to get the other instruments being overdubbed (such as bass and keyboards) in tune with the guitars.

The main synthesizer riff was produced using a combination of PPG Wave 2.2 and a Yamaha DX7.

Release
"Wouldn't It Be Good" was released in a single version and an extended 12" version. A remix by Simon Boswell, clocking in at 7:20, appears on the album Retro:Active 4: Rare & Remixed.

In 1985, "Wouldn't It Be Good" appeared on the soundtrack to the film Gotcha!

Music video
In the music video for "Wouldn't It Be Good", Kershaw is an extraterrestrial visitor who observes the characteristics of the people around him. It was directed by graphic designer Storm Thorgerson, was released in 1984 and received heavy rotation on MTV, which helped the song reach No. 46 on the US charts. It used chroma key technology to achieve the alien suit's special effects. The music video was filmed in mid-January 1984 over a period of three days, primarily in and around St. James' Court Hotel, London. The closing scenes were recorded at the Mullard Radio Astronomy Observatory, near Cambridge.

According to Kershaw, the song was about "always wanting it better than everyone else", a concept which the director of the video further developed and integrated into the video plot of Kershaw being the alien who steps into other people's shoes. But in the end the alien realises that it was not such a good idea at all, and decides to return to his home planet.

Critical reception
In a review of the single's 1991 reissue, Stephen Dalton of NME praised it as "a deeply felt ennui at the hopeless dreams and aspirations of idealistic youth" and a "welcome re-release from a much underrated innovator of early synth-pop".

Track listings
 7-inch single
A. "Wouldn't It Be Good" – 4:35
B. "Monkey Business" – 3:28

 12-inch single
A. "Wouldn't It Be Good" (special extended mix) – 6:50
B. "Monkey Business" – 3:28

Charts

Weekly charts

Year-end charts

Certifications

Cover versions

 In 1984, German singer Juliane Werding recorded a German-language version of "Wouldn't It Be Good", titled "Sonne auf der Haut".
 In 1986, Danny Hutton Hitters covered "Wouldn't It Be Good" which appeared on the soundtrack for the 1986 film Pretty in Pink.
 In 1986, Barbara Dickson covered "Wouldn't It Be Good" for her album The Right Moment 
 In 1992, American singer-songwriter Tommy Page recorded a cover of the song for his album, A Friend to Rely On.
 In 2006, German dance music act Cascada recorded their version for their album Everytime We Touch. It reached number 54 in the Swedish national record chart.
 Tina Arena released a piano ballad version of the song for her 2008 cover album Songs of Love & Loss 2, which was later released as a digital-exclusive single as part of her greatest hits album Greatest Hits & Interpretations in 2017.

References

External links
 

1984 singles
1984 songs
Cascada songs
MCA Records singles
Nik Kershaw songs
Song recordings produced by Peter Collins (record producer)
Songs written by Nik Kershaw